The beam of a ship is its width at its widest point. The maximum beam (BMAX) is the distance between planes passing through the outer extremities of the ship, beam of the hull (BH) only includes permanently fixed parts of the hull, and beam at waterline (BWL) is the maximum width where the hull intersects the surface of the water.

Generally speaking, the wider the beam of a ship (or boat), the more initial stability it has, at the expense of secondary stability in the event of a capsize, where more energy is required to right the vessel from its inverted position. A ship that heels on her beam ends has her deck beams nearly vertical.

Typical values 
Typical length-to-beam ratios (aspect ratios) for small sailboats are from 2:1 (dinghies to trailerable sailboats around ) to 5:1 (racing sailboats over ).

Large ships have widely varying beam ratios, some as large as 20:1.

Rowing shells designed for flatwater racing may have length to beam ratios as high as 30:1, while a coracle has a ratio of almost 1:1 – it is nearly circular.

Rule of thumb - formula

The beam of many monohull vessels can be calculated using the following formula:

Where LOA is Length OverAll and all lengths are in feet.

Some examples:
 For a standard  yacht: the cube root of 27 is 3, 3 squared is 9 plus 1 = 10.
 For a Volvo Open 70 yacht: 70.5 to the power of 2/3 = 17 plus 1 = 18.
Seawaymax.

As catamarans have more than one hull, there is a different beam calculation for this kind of vessel.

BOC
BOC stands for Beam On Centerline.  This term in typically used in conjunction with LOA (Length overall).  The ratio of LOA/BOC is used to estimate the stability of multihull vessels.  The lower the ratio the greater the boat's stability.

The BOC for vessels is measured as follows:
For a catamaran: the perpendicular distance from the centerline of one
hull to the centerline of the other hull, measured at deck level.
For a trimaran: the perpendicular distance between the centerline of the main
hull and the centerline of either ama, measured at deck level

Other beams

Other meanings of 'beam' in the nautical context are:
Beam – a timber similar in use to a floor joist, which runs horizontally from one side of the hull to the other athwartships.
Carlin – similar to a beam, except running in a fore and aft direction.
Beam  – the direction across the vessel, perpendicular to fore-and-aft; something lying in that direction is said to be abeam.

References

Notes
    
 

Nautical terminology
Ship measurements